Luang Pu Waen Suciṇṇo (16 February 1887 – 2 July 1985) was a Buddhist monk in Thailand, and part of the Thai Forest Tradition.

Early life and ordination

He took novice ordination at the age of 9 years old, in 1896, as per the request of his mother and grandmother. He had not received a formal education in his youth, but as a young novice he began studying the mūla-kachai, which is no-longer done in Thailand after Somdet Phra Maha Samana Chao Krom Phraya Vajirañāṇavarorasa changed the curriculum in the early 1900s. While he was still studying, he reached the age required for full ordination and took Bhikkhu ordination at Wat Saang Taw, with Phra Ajahn Waen as his preceptor.

Meeting Ajahn Mun and later life

After his original teachers had all disrobed, he felt the need to go searching for a new teacher, and finally met Ajahn Mun at around 1918. In 1921 he met Tan Chao Khun Upālī Guṇūpamājaan, who was revered by many and well-respected by Ajahn Mun himself. Luang Pu Waen Sucinno reordained as a monk in the Dhammayuttika Nikaya with Tan Chao Khun Upālī Guṇūpamājaa as his preceptor sometime between 1921 and 1931. In 1955, Luang Pu met Phra Ajaan Noo Sucitto, who later invited him to stay at Wat Doi Mae Pang, where Luang Pu was looked after until he died in 1985 due to health complications.

Exceptional Qualities

"Anyone who is interested in Lay people is only interested in Gain." - This was an important statement of Luang Por Waen. He was not interested in Lay people. He was neither interested in Novices nor Nuns. According to him, this interests are only for Gain, Praise and fame.

Like Ajahn Mun Bhuridatto who was the spiritual teacher of Luang Por Waen, he spent his life as a Thudong monk until he encountered with a leg disability. He lived alone, practiced alone in forests and preferred seclusion.

Drunken Dhamma

Verbal usage of the Thai word 'Dhammo' as 'Dham-Mo' was a famous metaphor in his Sermons. 'Maw' or 'Mo' is a Thai word which gives the meaning 'Drunken' or 'Intoxicated'. Luang Por Waen referred to the 'Future' and the 'Past' as 'Dham-Mo' which means 'Drunken Dhamma' and he referred to the 'Current Moment' as 'Dhammo' which means Straight Dhamma. "Don't think about future and past. It is Drunken Dhamma" -was his regular advice.

Popularity

Until a royal Thai air-force pilot had spotted him meditating in the sky, Luang Por Waen was a hidden gem in the rural Thailand. Though he didn't like fame, this incident made him the most popular monk of Thailand in that decade. He attracted the Royal Patronage and King Bhumipol became a closer devotee of Luan Por Waen. In the latter period of his life, the abbot of his resident monastery 'Wat Doi Mae Pang' had to limit and control the number of people who came to visit Luang Por Waen.

One day, a doctor had got a rare chance to ask from him about the incident of the air-force pilot. 'Do you think I'm a bird' - was the reply of Luang Por.

See also 
 Thai Forest Tradition
 Wat Aranyawiwake
 Ajahn Mun
 Wat Doi Mae Pang
 Wat Chedi Luang

Further reading
 Acariya Maha Boowa: Venerable Acariya Mun Bhuridatta Thera, a Spiritual Biography. Wat Pa Baan Taad 2003, Baan Taad, Amphoe Muang, Udon Thani, 41000 Thailand (no ISBN, available at this address, or 4MB pdf-download here)
 "The Life and Teachings of Luang Pu Waen Sucinno" Wat Doi Mae Pang 2015 (No ISBN available), Available for free distribution and download

References

External links

Thai Theravada Buddhist monks
Buddhist meditation
1985 deaths
1887 births
People from Loei province
20th-century Buddhist monks